Una is a 2016 drama film directed by Benedict Andrews based upon the play Blackbird by David Harrower, who also wrote the film's screenplay. It stars Rooney Mara, Ben Mendelsohn, Riz Ahmed, Ruby Stokes, Tara Fitzgerald, Natasha Little, and Tobias Menzies.

The film had its world premiere at the Telluride Film Festival on September 2, 2016. It was released in the United Kingdom on September 1, 2017, by Thunderbird Releasing and in the United States on October 6, 2017, by Swen.

Plot
A young woman, Una, arrives unexpectedly at an older man's workplace looking for the truth behind the three-month sexual relationship that occurred when she was a 13-year-old child and he was a next-door neighbor and trusted friend of her father. Over the course of the movie, it's shown in flashback what happened: The two planned to elope abroad, but the night before they were to take a ferry, Ray takes her virginity in a coast hotel room. He leaves the room afterwards and Una, believing he abandoned her, wanders the streets distraught and bewildered, to be returned home by police.

Ray served four years in jail for his crime, treated as the lowest form of humanity by fellow inmates. Having changed his name from "Ray" to "Peter Trevelyan," he has risen to management level in a large warehouse. Meanwhile, Una grew up lonely and confused, living with her mother in the same house they lived in before the incident, and in her adulthood, now takes solace in going out for one-night stands and returning home before dawn.

Una finds where he works through a newspaper photograph and confronts him. She is still emotionally wounded from what happened. Instead of empathizing with her, Ray at first fears she may want to damage his career or even kill him. 

Ray leaves the room to attend a critical staff meeting, where he must announce cutbacks and layoffs to employees. He was supposed to do the PR-friendly talk but instead tells his coworkers that management wanted him to generate a list of people to fire. He then leaves abruptly, and hides from angry executives and his fellow staff members. Una finds him. 

They quarrel: he insists that he was genuinely in love with her, is not by nature a hebephile, and had not been "grooming" her. He tells Una he is now married to a woman his own age. It's obvious that Ray and Una are still attracted to one another. To Una's surprise, he explains that he didn't abandon her; he had needed a walk and a drink to clear his head, but returned to find that she had vanished. 

Una instigates sex with him, but before it goes too far, Ray abruptly leaves and returns to his home, leaving her feeling abandoned once again. At home, Ray's wife arrive home to find him sleeping. She wakes him up and they have sex, but Ray does this with his eyes closed.

Una leaves the warehouse with Ray's coworker Scott (Ahmed), a young single man. She invites herself to Scott's flat, where she seduces him. She claims to be "Pete's" daughter, and persuades Scott to escort her to Ray's comfortable suburban home.

Ray and his wife are hosting a large party, and he is shocked to see Scott and Una arrive. The wife and Una talk briefly, and she drops a hint that their marriage is not entirely happy. Una wanders upstairs, where she curls up on the bed of a teenage girl—the daughter of Ray's wife, from an earlier marriage, also aged about 13—who is obviously loved and cared for. The girl enters and loudly demands an explanation. Ray denies Una's unspoken accusation. He insists Una is the only one of that age he has ever desired, that she was "the only one" as he kisses her face, all while his wife, step-daughter and Scott look on from a distance. Una walks off into the dark.

Cast

Rooney Mara as Una Spencer (age 28)
Ruby Stokes as Young Una Spencer (age 13)
Ben Mendelsohn as Ray Brooks/ Peter "Pete" Trevelyan
Riz Ahmed as Scott
Indira Varma as Sonia
Tara Fitzgerald as Andrea
Tobias Menzies as Mark
Isobelle Molloy as Holly
Ciarán McMenamin as John
Natasha Little as Yvonne

Production
In November 2014, it was announced that Rooney Mara and Ben Mendelsohn had been cast as Una and Ray respectively, with Benedict Andrews directing from a screenplay by David Harrower who also wrote the stage play on which the film is based. With Jean Doumanian, Patrick Daly, and Maya Amsellem, producing under their Jean Doumanian Productions and West End Films banners respectively. Celia Duval co-produced, with executive producers Jason Cloth, Aaron L. Gilbert under his Bron Studios banner, as well as Sharon Harel, Kevin Loader, Eve Schoukroun. In May 2015, Film4 joined the film as a financier. In June 2015, Indira Varma, Tara Fitzgerald, and Riz Ahmed were all confirmed to star in the film. Jed Kurzel composed the film's score.

Production on the film began on June 13, 2015, in the United Kingdom. Further filming locations include Dungeness, Greatstone and Lydd, in Romney Marsh, Kent which feature as a remote hideaway location.

Release
In September 2015, Variety released the first image from the film. In November 2015, it was announced the film had been re-titled Una. In November 2015, IndieWire released another image from the film.

The film had its world premiere at the Telluride Film Festival on September 2, 2016. It also screened at the Toronto International Film Festival on September 11, 2016 and the BFI London Film Festival on October 9, 2016.  Shortly after, Swen acquired U.S. distribution rights to the film, partnering with Eammon Films handling the theatrical release. Thunderbird Releasing acquired U.K. distribution rights to the film and released it in the United Kingdom on September 1, 2017. It was released on October 6, 2017, in the United States.

Reception
Una received positive reviews from film critics. It holds a 76% approval rating on review aggregator website Rotten Tomatoes, based on 98 reviews, with an average rating of 6.77/10. The website's critical consensus reads, "Unas well-matched leads bring an uncomfortable story fearlessly to life, keeping the movie consistently gripping as it navigates the tricky journey from stage to screen." On Metacritic, the film holds a rating of 62 out of 100, based on 28 critics, indicating "generally favorable reviews".

References

External links

2016 films
2016 drama films
2016 independent films
American drama films
American films based on plays
American independent films
British drama films
British films based on plays
British independent films
Canadian drama films
Canadian films based on plays
Canadian independent films
English-language Canadian films
2010s English-language films
Films about child sexual abuse
Film4 Productions films
Films scored by Jed Kurzel
Films shot in Kent
2010s Canadian films
2010s American films
2010s British films